Donald Pilon is an American politician from Maine. Pilon, a Democrat, served four terms in the Maine House of Representatives from 2004 to 2012. In June 2012, Pilon lost a Democratic primary to fellow State Representative Linda Valentino for State Senate. Pilon served as mayor of Saco, Maine from 2013 to 2015. He ran unsuccessfully for mayor in 2015 and 2017.

Pilon is a graduate of the University of New England.

References

Year of birth missing (living people)
Living people
People from Saco, Maine
Democratic Party members of the Maine House of Representatives
Mayors of places in Maine
University of New England (United States) alumni